

Forts Baker, Barry, and Cronkhite near Sausalito, California is a combination of historic sites that, as a group, was listed on the National Register of Historic Places (NRHP) in 1973.  Fort Baker is a major part.

It includes or is associated with the Lime Point Tract Reservation and the Tennessee Point Military Reservation.  The Lime Point Tract Reservation is a historic name for Fort Baker, which became the new name in 1897.

Cavallo Point, now a conference center or hotel, is included.

There is at least one notable example of Stick/Eastlake architecture included.

Gallery

See also

Fort Baker
Fort Barry
Fort Cronkhite
Baker–Barry Tunnel

References

Further reading

External links

Forts in California
Golden Gate National Recreation Area
Buildings and structures in Marin County, California
Closed installations of the United States Army
Formerly Used Defense Sites in California
Military facilities in the San Francisco Bay Area
Historic district contributing properties in California
Baker
Tourist attractions in Marin County, California
Queen Anne architecture in California
Victorian architecture in California
Historic districts on the National Register of Historic Places in California
National Register of Historic Places in Marin County, California